is a Japanese video game studio which has released adventure, strategy, and bishōjo games for the MSX, MSX2, PlayStation 2 and PC, including such titles as Symphonic Rain, Gadget Trial, Little Witch Parfait, Tristia of the Deep-Blue Sea (which has been made an original video animation), and Power Dolls. The studio has a number of teams working together.

Subsidiaries
KOGADO STUDIO, Inc. Design Production Division: Graphic design, digital content, corporate planning.
KOGADO Software Products: Video game studio.

List of teams in Kogado Studio
Usagi-san Team
Kuroneko-san Team
Iruka-san Team
Kuma-san Team
Shimarisu-san Team
Panda-san Team
Kitsune-san Team
Shukujo Team

List of developed video games

Usagi-san Team

Kuroneko-san Team

Iruka-san Team

Kuma-san Team

Shimarisu-san Team

Panda-san Team

Kitsune-san Team

See also
Cosmic Soldier (MSX)

References

External links
Kogado's official website (Japanese and Chinese)
Kogado's official production website
List of Kogado games on MSX
GameFAQs entry for Kogado Studio

Video game companies of Japan
Video game development companies
Japanese companies established in 1960
Video game companies established in 1960
Software companies based in Tokyo